The fifth season of the American comedy television series Silicon Valley premiered in the United States on HBO on March 25, 2018. The season contained 8 episodes, and concluded on May 13, 2018.

Cast

Main 
 Thomas Middleditch as Richard Hendricks
 Josh Brener as Nelson "Big Head" Bighetti
 Martin Starr as Bertram Gilfoyle
 Kumail Nanjiani as Dinesh Chugtai
 Amanda Crew as Monica Hall
 Zach Woods as Donald "Jared" Dunn
 Matt Ross as Gavin Belson
 Suzanne Cryer as Laurie Bream
 Jimmy O. Yang as Jian-Yang

Recurring

Episodes

Production 
In May 2017, the series was renewed for a fifth season, and it was announced that T.J. Miller would not return to the series for the fifth season. For this season, Clay Tarver was promoted to executive producer and co-showrunner alongside Mike Judge and Alec Berg, who also serve as showrunners and executive producers.

Reception

Critical response 
On review aggregator Rotten Tomatoes, the season holds an 87% approval rating, earning a "Certified Fresh" rating. It holds an average score of 7.25/10 based on 27 reviews. The site's critical consensus reads "Five seasons in, Silicon Valley finds a new way to up the ante with tighter, less predictable plots, while still maintaining its clever brand of comedic commentary." Similarly, on Metacritic, which uses a weighted average, holds a score of 73 out of 100, based on reviews from 5 critics, indicating "generally favorable reviews".

In his review for The Atlantic, David Sims praised the satirical nature of the show, writing that the show's "creators have long prided themselves on staying ahead of tech trends via thorough research, and this new season seems more on point than ever". Dan Einav of Financial Times gave the season a mostly positive review, writing that it was "still one of the best [comedies] on TV, even without the brilliantly coarse TJ Miller".

Still, other critics felt Miller's absence, and noticed the repetitiveness of the series. Chuck Barney, writing for the San Jose Mercury News, noted "Miller and his contributions as the dimwitted, weed-smoking tech investor Erlich Bachman are undeniably missed". Likewise, Refinery29s Ariana Romero expressed disappointment that Miller's departure had not improved "its very noticeable, and unnecessary, lack of women on screen".

Home media 
The fifth season was released on DVD only (no Blu-ray) on September 4, 2018.

References

External links 
 
 

2018 American television seasons
Silicon Valley (TV series)